Sundaram may refer to:

People with the surname
 Anjan Sundaram, journalist and author
 Jomo Kwame Sundaram, Malaysian economist
 Kalyan Sundaram (1904–1992), Indian civil servant
 Mugur Sundar, choreographer in South Indian cinema
 Raghu Sundaram, Indian-born American academic
 Raju Sundaram (born 1968), Indian actor, film director, and choreographer
 Tribhuvandas Luhar ("Sundaram", 1908–1991), Gujarati poet
 Vivan Sundaram (born 1943), Indian artist
 V. A. Sundaram (1896 –1967), an activist in the Indian Independence movement

Other
 Sieve of Sundaram, a method for finding prime numbers
 Sundaram (theatre group), a Bengali theatre group
 Vietnam Veedu Sundaram, a playwright and screenwriter

See also